Byrraju Ramalinga Raju (born 16 September 1954) is an Indian businessman. He is the founder of Satyam Computer Services and served as its chairman and CEO from 1987 until 2009. Raju stepped down following his admission to embezzlement from the company to the tune of ₹7,136 crores (approximately US$1.5 billion), including ₹5040 crores (approximately US$1 billion) of non-existent cash and bank balances. In 2015, he was convicted of corporate fraud, which led to the collapse of Satyam Computers.

Early life
Ramalinga Raju, the eldest of Four children, was born on 16 September 1954. He earned a Bachelor of Commerce degree from Andhra Loyola College at Vijayawada and subsequently earned an MBA from Ohio University in the United States. After returning to India in 1977, Raju married at the age of twenty two. He ventured into many businesses including Dhanunjaya Hotels; and a cotton spinning mill named Sri Satyam Spinning, funded by Andhra Pradesh Industrial Development Corporation (APIDC), with an investment of  9 crore (worth almost $7 million in 1983 prices). As the businesses failed Raju moved into real estate and started a construction company named Maytas Infra Limited.

Family 
Ramalinga Raju is married to Nandini and the couple had two children Teja Raju, and Rama Raju. Teja Raju is married to Divya, a Bharatanatyam dancer. Younger son Ramaraju married Sandhya Raju, daughter of P. R. Venkatarama Raju, managing director of Ramco Cements.

Career
In 1987, Raju incubated Satyam Computer Services along with one of his brothers-in-law, DVS Raju at P&T colony in Secunderabad and 20 employees. In 1991, Satyam won its first fortune 500 client – John Deere. Raju navigated Indian bureaucracy to obtain the required clearance to transmit data from India.  The company went public in 1992. Raju was enrolled in the Owner/President Management (OPM) program at Harvard Business School in the 1990s. In an interview with Deccan Chronicle way back in 1998, Raju was talking about Satyam's ambition of operating out of 50 countries with an employee count of more than 50,000. In 1999, Raju launched Satyam Infoway (Sify) as Satyam's internet subsidiary, thereby becoming an early participant in the Indian internet service market. Sify was later sold to Raju Vegesna.

Business and politics
In September 1995, as Raju was building Satyam, Andhra Pradesh had a new Chief Minister, Chandra Babu Naidu, who wanted to bring in change. Naidu saw IT as a strategic industry to focus on and Raju became instrumental in shaping the state's information technology initiatives like 'Mee Kosam' ("For you" in Telugu). Raju had unfettered access to the chief Minister of Andhra Pradesh at a very personal level. Research into his life has exposed close links between business and politics.

Philanthropy
The major philanthropic foundations he has founded and grown to large scale between 2000 and 2008 are:

Byrraju Foundation:

The Byrraju Foundation, a family run philanthropic organization, was started in July 2001 by him and his 2 brothers in the memory of his father Late Byrraju Satyanarayana Raju. The Foundation adopted 200 villages in 6 districts of Andhra Pradesh namely East Godavari, West Godavari, Krishna, Guntur, Ranga Reddy and Visakhapatnam. The foundation built progressive self-reliant rural communities by adopting a holistic approach. It provided 40 different programs like healthcare, environment improvement, sanitation, primary education, adult literacy and skills development ., GramIT etc. which impacted over 3 million people. Some significant achievements of the foundation are: Over 7 million patient visits, 53,250 persons made literate, 89,000 toilets built in rural homes, Livelihood skill training and certification for over 26,000 unemployed rural youth, setting up 61 drinking water plants and 4 GramIT Centres which employed 500 rural youth.

Currently, after the Satyam episode, the foundation has 117 adopted villages where it runs 110 health centers with the help of CARE foundation and operates 18 water plants.

The local people across the region hail the development works undertaken by the Byrraju Foundation and are appreciative of the positive impact it had on them.

Emergency Management and Research Institute (EMRI 108):

Raju also set up a state of the art and first of its kind 24X7 emergency service named Emergency Management and Research Institute (EMRI 108) in August 2005. It was modelled after the 911 service in America and had an aim of giving citizens in an emergency the benefit of getting timely attention and support. This was done by providing a single toll-free number accessible from mobile and land line. Recently Forbs magazine has published an Article about the "Emergency Management System in US" (see in the External Link below).

Initially started with just 75 ambulances, EMRI has currently expanded to 10,697 ambulances covering 15 states and 2 union territories, serving over 26,710 emergencies per day, covering a population of 75 Crores (increasing reach of health care in rural, hilly & tribal areas).  EMRI has more than 45,000 employees on its rolls. Till date 4.7 crore beneficiaries have availed these services, 4.38 lakh deliveries were assisted, and 18.56 lakh lives were saved since inception.

All the call-centre activities and support activities for emergency handling were automated. While state Governments were providing most of the funding, EMRI part funded and managed the services in PPP mode. After the Satyam episode, Raju resigned from the Board of Directors. The GVK group then took responsibility to run the institute. It now runs as a free service as a very successful public private partnership (PPP) model.

HMRI 104:

Raju was instrumental in launching a public private partnership (PPP) model between Satyam and The Government of Andhra Pradesh in 2007, termed as Health Management and Research Institute (HMRI 104). Before its launch, Andhra Pradesh faced a massive shortage in Primary Healthcare Centres (PHC) and Community Healthcare Centres (CHC). This resulted in a stressed public healthcare system in the state which meant lower quality care for its citizens. By providing a helpline for all types of health-related queries and telemedicine, HMRI was able to lessen the burden on the public health system.

The program was aimed at the rural poor who had little to no access to qualified doctors and healthcare information. It also constituted a training program for Registered Medical Practitioners (RMPs) and ran mobile health clinics.

Naandi Foundation: in 1998, the Naandi foundation was set up by the then CM of Andhra Pradesh Mr. N. Chandrababu Naidu, along with the heads of the 4 major business houses in the state: Dr K. Anji Reddy - Dr Reddy's Labs, Mr. Ramesh Gelli - founder of Global Trust Bank, Mr. B. Ramalinga Raju – Chairman of Satyam Computer Services, and Mr. K. S. Raju-Chairman of the Nagarjuna group of companies.

The aim of the foundation was to increase literacy among the poor and marginalized sections of society by increasing their enrollment in primary school. The students were also provided 1 full meal during the day. The foundation was able to reach 880 schools in the twin cities of Hyderabad and Secunderabad and feed 150000 children daily.

Accounting scandal
Raju resigned from the Satyam board after Satyam Scandal, admitting to falsifying revenues, margins and over 5,000 crore of cash balances at the company. The Indian affiliate of PricewaterhouseCoopers, the company's auditors, appears to have certified the company had $1.1 Billion in cash when the real number was $78 million.

Just a few months before the scandal broke out, Raju tried to persuade investors by claiming that the company is sound and that past October he surprised analysts with better-than-expected results, claiming that "the company had achieved this in a challenging global macroeconomic environment, and amidst the volatile currency scenario that became reality"

A botched acquisition attempt involving Maytas in December 2008 led to corporate governance concerns among Indian investors and plunge in the share price of Satyam. In January 2009, Raju indicated that Satyam's accounts had been falsified over a number of years. Total assets on Satyam's balance sheet tripled during 2003–07 to $2.2 billion. He confessed to an accounting fraud to the tune of 7,000 crore or $1.5 billion and resigned from the Satyam board on 7 January 2009. Satyam was purchased by Tech Mahindra in April 2009 and renamed Mahindra Satyam.

In his letter, Raju explained his modus operandi to something that started as a single lie but led to another as "What started as a marginal gap between actual operating profit and the one reflected in the books continued to grow over the years. It has attained unmanageable proportions as the size of the company's operations grew over the years.". Raju described how an initial cover-up for a poor quarterly performance escalated: "It was like riding a tiger, not knowing how to get off without being eaten."

Raju and his brother, B Rama Raju, were then arrested by the CID Andhra Pradesh police headed by V S K Kaumudi, IPS on charges of breach of trust, conspiracy, cheating, falsification of records. Raju may face life imprisonment if convicted of misleading investors. Raju had also used dummy accounts to trade in Satyam's shares, violating the insider trading norm.

The Government of Andhra Pradesh attached 44 properties belonging to the family members of the promoters of Satyam Computers in the case against Raju.

It has now been alleged that these accounts may have been the means of siphoning off the missing funds. Raju has admitted to overstating the company's cash reserves by USD$ 1.5 billion. Raju was hospitalized in September 2009 following a minor heart attack and underwent angioplasty. Raju was granted bail on condition that he should report to the local police station once a day and that he should not attempt to tamper with the current evidence. This bail was revoked on 26 October 2010 by the Supreme Court of India and he has been ordered to surrender by 8 November 2010.

Court proceedings
In November 2010, Raju surrendered after the Supreme Court in August cancelled the bail granted to him by a lower court in Hyderabad, where Satyam is based.

The Supreme Court on 4 November 2011 granted bail to Raju since the Central Bureau of Investigation (CBI) failed to file charges on time. According to Indian law, if a chargesheet is not filed within 90 days, then the accused person has a right to obtain Default Bail.

On 28 October 2013, the Enforcement directorate filed a chargesheet against Raju and 212 others. The filed report states that "it transpires that the accused resorted to inter-connected transactions, so as to ensure that crime proceeds were distanced from its initial beneficiaries, and laundered the said proceeds under the cover of the corporate veil, with an ulterior motive to project the properties so acquired as untainted ones".

On 9 April 2015, Ramalinga Raju and his brothers were sentenced to 7 years in jail, fined ₹5.5 crore.

On 11 May 2015, within a month of being convicted, Ramalinga Raju and all others who were found guilty were granted bail by a special court in Hyderabad. The bail amount for R. Raju and his brother was set at ₹10,00,000 and the other convicts was set at ₹50,000 only.

On 10 January 2018 India's capital market regulator has banned global auditing firm Price Waterhouse (PW) from auditing listed companies in India for two years for its alleged role of collusion with the directors and employees of erstwhile Satyam Computer Services, in perpetrating the country's biggest corporate accounting scandal.

In popular culture 

 Bad Boy Billionaires: India - 2020 Netflix original documentary anthology webseries
 Untitled SonyLIV Telugu-Hindi bilingual web series based on his personal life from the book The Double Life of Ramalinga Raju.

References

External links
https://www.forbes.com/sites/williamhaseltine/2019/01/23/what-the-u-s-can-learn-from-indias-emergency-response-system/#435914e3b274

1954 births
Living people
Indian fraudsters
Telugu people
Corporate crime
Businesspeople from Andhra Pradesh
Crime in Andhra Pradesh
People from West Godavari district
Harvard Business School alumni
People convicted of insider trading
Indian chief executives
Ohio University alumni
Indian Internet company founders
Indian technology company founders